These are lists of actresses.

By nationality or ethnicity
List of American film actresses
List of American television actresses 
List of British actresses
List of Bangladeshi actresses
List of Bengali actresses
List of Canadian actresses
List of Chinese actresses
List of Czech actresses 
List of Filipino actresses 
List of Indian film actresses
List of Indian television actresses
List of Iranian actresses
List of Italian actresses
List of Japanese actresses
List of Mexican actresses 
List of Nepalese actresses
List of Pakistani actresses 
List of Taiwanese actresses 
List of Tamil film actresses
List of Thai actresses

Other
List of Bollywood actresses 
List of pornographic actresses by decade